The Persian Gulf Command was a United States Army service command established in December 1943 to facilitate the supply of US lend-lease war material to the Soviet Union, through the "Persian Corridor".

History
The command originated in September 1941, when the US Military Iranian Mission, led by Colonel Raymond A. Wheeler (US Army Corps of Engineers) was established. At this same time, the Iranian District of the North Atlantic Division was set up to provide construction support. In August 1942 the mission was re-designated as the Persian Gulf Service Command, and in December 1943 became the Persian Gulf Command. It subsequently came under the command of a succession of engineer generals. Following the War Department's full militarization of construction, the Iranian District ceased to exist in May 1943. Three districts directly subordinate to the area command eventually replaced it. Eventually thousands of personnel worked in Iraq as well.

Iran was already occupied by British and Russian troops who were guarding the oil fields and monitoring the pro-German Iranians (Persians). Adolf Hitler believed that German military forces could eventually take possession of the oil fields and the railroad that went through the mountains from the Persian Gulf to the Russian border. 

Conditions in Persia were foreign and inhospitable to the U.S. forces, with hotter temperatures than they had trained for. Those who arrived in the summer of 1942 met with pouring rain and mud more than a foot deep, but had to pitch tents to sleep on the ground for the next six months until huts were built. The rainy season was followed by temperatures that rose as high as 100 degrees, accompanied by sand storms that lasted for up to a week, constantly changing the landscape.

Between 1942 and 1945, the United States equipped Russia with 192,000 trucks and thousands of aircraft, combat vehicles, tanks, weapons, ammunition and petroleum products. Before the construction of the aircraft assembly plant at Abadan, Iran, the United States Army Air Forces flew A-20 medium bombers across the Atlantic to Abadan, where they were turned over to Russian flyers. Army engineers transformed the camel paths into a highway for trucks and improved the railroad with its more than 200 tunnels so trains could carry tanks and tons of other heavy equipment over the mountains. Historian David Glantz has concluded that U.S. and British lend-lease assisted Soviet victory on the Eastern Front, but was not a critical factor, commenting that "left to themselves, the Soviets might have taken 12 to 18 months longer to defeat the Wehrmacht".

The Command, in conjunction with the British Tenth Army and Soviet troops, also provided security for the Teheran Conference in the fall of 1943, the meeting of United States President Franklin D. Roosevelt, British Prime Minister Winston Churchill, and Soviet Premier Joseph Stalin. Allied troops across the country were on alert to protect the leaders, and British, Soviet and American troops together prevented an alleged German assassination attempt at the conference.

PGC Insignia
 The PGC shoulder sleeve insignia featured a green shield, 3 inches high, with a 7 pointed white star above a red scimitar fimbriated in white bendwise, point up.

The red scimitar, from the flag of Iran (or Persia) represented the warlike spirit of the ancient Persians. The white seven pointed star is taken from the flag of the Kingdom of Iraq, and represents purity and the religion of the Middle East. The green color of the shield denotes the agriculture of Persia in antiquity, and also stands for Islam, the religion of both Iran and Iraq. The colors red, green and white are found in the flags of both countries.

The date of the insignia's original approval is not recorded in the Institute of Heraldry files. Correspondence dated 13 May 1944 indicates the insignia drawing may be declassified. The unclassified drawing was approved on 29 August 1944.

Commanders
 Col. Donald Shingler, August 1942 - October 1942.
 Brig. Gen. Donald H. Connolly, 1942–1944.
 Donald Prentice Booth, January 1945 until inactivation.

Further reading

References

External links
Persian Gulf Command Veterans Organization
PGC Veteran's Organization
T. H. Vail Motter. The Persian Corridor and Aid to Russia . United States Army Center of Military History, 2000 (original print 1952). CMH Pub 8-1
A Short Guide to Iraq (World War II War Department publication for soldiers)

Regional commands of the United States Army
Middle East theatre of World War II
Iran–United States relations
Soviet Union–United States relations
Iran in World War II
Military history of Iran during World War II